Jakub Chrpa (born February 13, 1994) is a Czech professional ice hockey player. He is currently playing for Piráti Chomutov of the Czech Extraliga.

Chrpa made his Czech Extraliga debut playing with Piráti Chomutov during the 2015-16 Czech Extraliga season.

References

External links

1994 births
Living people
Piráti Chomutov players
Czech ice hockey forwards
Sportovní Klub Kadaň players
Sportspeople from Chomutov